St Austell and Newquay is a constituency in Cornwall represented in the House of Commons of the UK Parliament since 2015 by Steve Double, a Conservative. It is on the South West Peninsula of England, bordered by both the Celtic Sea to the northwest and English Channel to the southeast.

History
2010 election
On its creation in 2010, the constituency had, based on complex forecasts involving its three constitutive seats, which factored in to different degrees the recent local election results, a widely varying notional Liberal Democrat majority (see results below). In analysis, one forecast suggested that St Austell and Newquay would prove to be a safe seat, whereas another suggested an extremely marginal seat. The majority achieved was lower than an average of the two forecasts, but by no means the most slender of majorities achieved in that election.

In 2010, the Labour Party candidate polled in line with results of the recent decades in the forerunner seats, with 7.2% of the vote. Mebyon Kernow, the Cornish devolutionist party, achieved its highest share of the vote in any constituency, but narrowly lost its deposit by not reaching the 5% threshold.

2015 election
The seat was won by a Conservative on a majority of more than 15% which would rarely be termed marginal; however, approximately half the electorate of the seat fell within areas represented by a Liberal or Liberal Democrat MP between October 1974 and 2015 - Truro (later adopting a suffix- and St Austell). In terms of the important consideration of length of tenure the seat fails to be describable as in any analysis "safe".

2017 election
Theresa May announced a snap election would take place on 8 June 2017. In this constituency, Conservative incumbent Steve Double won with an increased majority of 11,142. The constituency also saw a gigantic 18.8% increase in the Labour vote, in common with many south-west seats, pushing the Liberal Democrats into third place.

2019 election
The Liberal Democrats further faded into a more distant third place, with their policy of cancelling Brexit failing to attract voters, in a constituency which voted 64% to Leave the European Union. Unlike many seats across the UK, the Labour vote held up pretty well, with only a 2.6% drop in their vote share.

Boundaries

The Borough of Restormel wards of Bethel, Crinnis, Edgcumbe North, Edgcumbe South, Fowey and Tywardreath, Gannel, Gover, Mevagissey, Mount Charles, Poltair, Rialton, Rock, St Blazey, St Columb, St Enoder, St Ewe, St Stephen, and Treverbyn.

The constituency was created for the 2010 general election, following a review of parliamentary representation by the Boundary Commission, which increased the number of seats in the county from five to six. It has the same boundaries as the former Borough of Restormel, with the exception of the ward of Lostwithiel, which remains in the South East Cornwall constituency. Previously, the historic area was divided between the North Cornwall, South East Cornwall and Truro and St Austell seats.

Constituency profile
Workless claimants (registered jobseekers) were in November 2012 higher than the national average of 3.8%, at 4.2% of the population, based on a statistical compilation by The Guardian.

Members of Parliament

Elections

Elections in the 2010s

See also
List of parliamentary constituencies in Cornwall

Notes

References

Parliamentary constituencies in Cornwall
Constituencies of the Parliament of the United Kingdom established in 2010
St Austell